Don't Don is the second studio album by South Korean boy band Super Junior. It was released by SM Entertainment on September 20, 2007 in South Korea. This is the group's first album as thirteen members, with the addition of Kyuhyun a year prior. Slightly different from their first album, this album focuses on more different kinds of pop melodies, most notably on those that approach alternative rock, modern R&B and retro dance-pop, with almost all tracks in the album containing string sections. 60,000 copies were sold within the first week of release and 164,058 copies were sold by the end of December, and was certified as the second best-selling album of 2007, with the first being SG Wannabe's fourth studio album The Sentimental Chord.

Two different repackaged versions, one with three new tracks and a remixed track, and another with one remixed track and a DVD, was released on November 5, 2007 and November 9, 2007 respectively in South Korea. A digital disc version of the album was released on November 27, 2007.

Pre-release and recording

When promotions for Super Junior's previous hit single, "U" completed, SM Entertainment announced that the group were processing on the beginning touches for their second full-length album, with an expected November 2006 release. However, due to Heechul's car accident on August 10, 2006, schedules regarding album recordings had to be postponed. Another car accident involving four other members on April 19, 2007 also affected the album schedules. Kyuhyun, the most injured out of the four, was not discharged from the hospital until July 5, 2007.

During a fan-meet in Shanghai on August 26, 2007, Han Geng revealed that recording schedules for the album were finally active and the album would be released in September, followed up by Shindong's announcement that he would be on a short hiatus from hosting activities to work on the album, and an official announcement of the re-appearance of Kyuhyun in news articles. On September 5, 2007, Kang-in revealed his new hairstyle at a public radio, causing an intense anticipation within the media for the group's second album comeback. Their new album concept became a hot topic of debate within netizens as more information of the new concept unraveled. A few days later, SM Entertainment released the album's first promotional image, which contains a silhouette of the thirteen members. The mysterious image increased discussion for the anticipated new album concept, but the new concept was not fully revealed until the release date of the album. However, leaked pictures of the group's new image lightly surfaced across the web a week before the official release date.

On September 13, 2007, the label announced an official date for the album release. Demonstrative ringtones of the tracks in the album was released online on September 19, 2007. The official album was released on September 20, 2007. Pre-orders for the album began in South Korea on September 14, 2007.

"돈 돈! (Don't Don)", also the name of the album, was chosen to be the first single. Transliterated to "Money, Money! (Don't Don)", the title is a pun, playing with the words "don,", which means money, and "donda", which means to go insane. "Don't Don" is introduced as a genre of SMP (SM Music Performance), a genre invented by the company, that consists of the strong mix of R&B, rock, rap, and hip hop. The musical style of "Don't Don" has the combination of heavy guitar riffs, fast drum rhythms, electric guitar, a violin solo, and other musical instruments that make the single a rare musical. In an effort to promote the world to become a more innocent and magnanimous place to live, the lyrics sends a message about how money, hypocrisy, and the change of society has made the world into a twisted and greedy place to live. "Marry U" was chosen to be the second single. Different from the fast-pace first single, "Marry U" is a medium-tempo R&B ballad, reviving a classic image which is a contrast of their dark image from their first single. The rest of the album consists of soft ballads, string section focus, retro R&B, and 1980s style trendy dance songs, a style that is completely different from their first album, which a majority of the music consisted of modernized R&B dance-pop. However, the trend of bubblegum pop still remains in the album, such as the second track, "Sapphire Blue."

Many members contributed in the production of the album. Yesung, Ryeowook, Kyuhyun were active as background vocalists while Eunhyuk, one of the main rappers of the group, was in charge of most of the rap lyrics in the album. Leeteuk, Sungmin, Eunhyuk, and Donghae also wrote the lyrics for the dance/pop song, "I am," arranged by Yoon Jongshin. Famous musicians like Yoon Jongshin, Kim Johan, Kim Youngho, Hwang Sungjae, Kim Changhyun, etc. also participated in the production of the album.

Repackaged versions
Two repackaged versions of the album were released a month after the release of the album. The album's second version, the CD repackaged version, was released on November 5, 2007 with four new tracks: "Marry U" (New Ver.), "A Man In Love", "The girl is mine", and "A Man In Love" (Remix). Although the song "Marry U", was included in the original album, the CD repackaged version brought in a new version of the single, which became the album's second single. The remixed version of "A Man In Love" became a semi promo-single for the repackaged album and is one of the group's performance songs. The third album version, the CD+DVD repackaged version, was released on November 9, 2007. Although there are no new tracks added to the CD unlike the second version, an extra DVD is added to the album which contains music videos and behind-the-scene clips behind the production of the album.

Album packaging and image
The packaging and image of Don't Don is darker than that of their first album. Don't Don came to stores with thirteen different covers, each cover featuring a different member. All thirteen covers of the members are included within the CD package, and the covers can be changed anytime. First impressions of the album were critical but well-accepted, as Super Junior transformed into a much edgier image than from their previous image in "U." The members sported bleached hair and had astounding hairstyles, which were influences from the combination of punk fashion and hip hop fashion. Some of the members also imprinted large temporary tattoos on their skin, which surrounded the arms, back, and stomach.

With the release of the album's second version, the group quickly transformed to a classical image to complement the second single, "Marry U". Hairstyles were slightly modified and their hair color were darker. The album's third version revived the group with a modern and fashionable boy band image.

Critical reception and promotion
Don't Don debuted at #1 on the MIAK K-pop albums chart, quickly selling more than Lee Soo Young's and Wheesung's new albums that were released at least two weeks before Don't Don. The album sold 66,678 copies in its first month of release. After only three months of release, 164,058 copies were sold by the end of December, making it the second best-selling album of 2007.

The album also received overseas success, as it peaked at #1 on the Five Music J-pop/K-pop Chart and the G-music J-pop Chart in Taiwan within the first week of release. The album also debuted at #3 on the G-music Combo Billboard Chart, defeating Taiwanese boy band K One who also released their album on the same week. Don't Don became the highest ranked Korean album that made it to the Taiwan charts, defeating even the top Korean Wave boy bands TVXQ and Shinhwa who debuted at a lower rank.

Super Junior's first performance for Don't Don was on September 21, 2007, performing the first single "Don't Don" on KBS's Music Bank. It was their first performance in which the group performed together as thirteen after a whole year, arousing attention. Promotions for "Don't Don" lasted almost three months and aside Music Bank, Super Junior also performed on other music programs, such as on SBS's Popular Songs and M.NET's M! Countdown. Not long after the release of the second single, "Marry U", Super Junior became co-hosts of a new SBS variety program, Explorers of the Human Body along with Shin Dongyup. The new program acclaimed critical praise in its first season, and always ranked as SBS's most-viewed program every Sunday. However, the first season quickly ended with thirteen episodes in February 2008 due to Super Junior's busy schedule with their first concert tour, Super Show. However, SBS is in talks to create a second season.

Track listings

DVD 
"Marry U" jacket sketch
Prologue
Relay Talk
Member Personal Story! "Talk to Myself!"
Epilogue
"Don't Don" MV Making Film
"Don't Don" MV
"Marry U" MV Making Film

Notes
 – CD version has the New version

Personnel
Credits are adapted from the album liner notes. The tracks numbering is according to the repackage and Japanese edition of the album.

Musicians
Super Junior – vocals, background vocals (1, 5, 16)
Leeteuk – lyrics (8)
Heechul – background vocals (16)
Han Geng
Yesung – background vocals (4, 7, 8, 9, 10, 11, 12, 13, 15, 18)
Kangin
Shindong – background vocals (16)
Sungmin – lyrics (8), background vocals (4, 8, 10, 18)
Eunhyuk – lyrics (8), rap making (2, 3, 4, 6, 11, 13, 14, 17, 18), rap lyrics (2, 3, 4, 6, 11, 13, 14, 17, 18)
Donghae – lyrics (8), rap making (4, 11, 17, 18), rap lyrics (4, 11, 17, 18)
Siwon
Ryeowook – background vocals (4, 7, 8, 9, 10, 11, 12, 13, 17, 18)
Kibum
Kyuhyun – background vocals (4, 7, 8, 9, 10, 12, 17, 18)

Additional musicians

Yoo Young-jin – lyrics (1, 5, 16), composition (1, 5, 16), arrangement (1, 5, 16), rearrangement (16), director (1), rap making (1, 5, 16), rap lyrics (1, 5, 16) voice modeling guitar (1, 5, 16), violin conductor (1), background vocals (1, 5, 16), acoustic guitar (5, 16), remix (16)
Tae Hoon – lyrics (2)
Young-hu Kim – lyrics (3), composition (3), arrangement (3, 17), background vocals (3, 17)
Kwon Yun-jung – lyrics (3, 4, 9, 18), director (18)
Yoon Jong-shin – lyrics (6), composition (6)
 – lyrics (7, 10), guitar (3, 7, 8, 10, 12)
Cho Jun-young – lyrics (11), composition (11), arrangement (11)
Yoo Jae-ha – lyrics (12), composition (12)
Shiro – lyrics (13)
Park Chang-hyun – lyrics (14), composition (14), arrangement (14), background vocals (14)
Seong Nak-ho – lyrics (15)
Cheon Tae-hyuk – lyrics (17), composition (17)
c.close – Japanese lyrics (18)
Michael Scott Hartung – composition (2)
Thomas Charles La Verdi – composition (2)
Lee Jea-myoung – composition (4, 18), arrangement (4, 18)
Lee Keun-ho – composition (6)
Kenzie – composition (7, 10), arrangement (7, 8, 10, 12), additional composition (12), additional lyrics (12)
Greg Lynch – composition (8)
Hwang Sung-jae – composition (9), arrangement (9, 13), keyboard (13)
Ken Ingwersen – composition (13)
Kim Jo-han – composition (15), background vocals (15)
An Ik-su – arrangement (2), guitar (2)
Lee Jun-ho – arrangement (6), all sources programing (6)
Lee Ju-hyong – arrangement (13), background vocals (13), synth (13)
Yoo Ji-sang – arrangement (13), rhythm (13)
Kim Min-soo – arrangement (15)
Badook – rap making (1), rap lyrics (1)
Hoonyhoon – rap making (5, 16), rap lyrics (5, 16), background vocals (5, 16)
Groovie.K – electric guitar (1), acoustic guitar (5, 16)
Henry – violin (1)
Soo-man Lee – violin conductor (1)
Sam Lee – guitar (4, 18)
Lee Sung-ryul – guitar (6, 13)
Hong Jun-ho – guitar (9, 15)
Ko Tae-yong – guitar (11, 14, 17)
Min Jae-hyun – bass (7, 8, 10, 12)
Jeong Jae-il – bass (9)
Lee Sang-min – drum (9, 15)
Song Young-joo – piano (9)
Gil Eun-kyung – keyboard (4, 18) piano (7)
Jang Hyo-suk – alto saxophone (6)
Moon Ji-hwan – background vocals (2)
Kim Hyeon-a – background vocals (5, 16)
Kang Tae-woo – background vocals (6)
Byun Jae-won – background vocals (9, 13)
Jang Jeong-woo – background vocals (11)
Chun Dan-bi – background vocals (14)
Kim Hyo-soo – background vocals (15)
Shim Sang-won – strings arrangement and conductor (3, 8)
Lee Na-il – strings arrangement and conductor (4, 7, 9, 12, 13, 18)
Shin Min – strings arrangement and conductor (11)
K-Strings – strings (3, 4, 7, 8, 9, 11, 12, 13, 18)
Lee Ju-myong – vocal and chorus director (13)
Toshio Fujiwara – director (18)

Technical personnel
Soo-man Lee – producer
Cheon "bigboom" Hoon at Sonic Korea – mastering (1–17)
Hiroshi Kawasaki (FLAIR) – mastering (18)
Yoo Young-jin at SM Booming System – recording, mixing
Lee Sung-ho at SM Yellow Tail, SM Blue Ocean and SM Concert Hall – recording, mixing
Namkoong Jin at SM Concert Hall – recording, mixing
Park Chang-hyun at SM Yellow Tail – recording 
Kat at SM Blue Ocean – recording 
Hwang Sung-jae at SM Blue Ocean and BJJ – recording 
Huh Jung-hee at SM Blue Ocean – recording
Young-hu Kim at SM Blue Ocean and SM Concert Hall – recording
Kenzie at SM Blue Ocean – recording
Park Kyung-joon at Rui – recording
Kim Chul-soon at Rui – recording
Cho Chang-hee at Music Tower – recording
Um Chan-yong at Lead Sound – recording
Hong Seung-heun at Chungeum – recording
Jang Min at Silk – recording
Kim Min-hee at Silk – recording
Oh Seung-geun at T-Studio – recording
Kim Jo-han at DGHETTO – recording
Hideaki Jinbu – recording
Masahiro Kawata – recording

Charts
All charts are derived from offline sales only.

Weekly charts

Monthly charts

Year-end charts

Accolades

Release history
Aside South Korea, Don't Don was re-released in other countries under different labels.

See also
 Don't Don
 
 Marry U

Notes

References

External links
 SM Entertainment's Official Site
 Super Junior's Official Site 
 Super Junior's Official Chinese Site

2007 albums
Super Junior albums
SM Entertainment albums
Avex Taiwan albums
Korean-language albums